Köhnədaxar (also, Köhnədəhar, Këgnadakhar and Kekhna-Dakhar) is a village in the Ismailli Rayon of Azerbaijan.  The village forms part of the municipality of Qaraqaya.

References 

Populated places in Ismayilli District